Patricia Jude Kensit (born 4 March 1968) is an English actress and was the lead singer of the pop band Eighth Wonder in the 1980s.

Beginning her career as a child actor, Kensit gained attention when she acted in a string of commercials for Birds Eye frozen peas. She then went on to appear in the films The Great Gatsby (1974), Gold (1974), Alfie Darling (1975), The Blue Bird (1976) and Hanover Street (1979). Balancing a dual career as both an actress and a singer, in 1983, Kensit formed and became the lead singer of the pop band Eighth Wonder. The group produced several successful singles including "I'm Not Scared" and "Cross My Heart" before their split in 1989.

Kensit achieved further success in her breakthrough role as Suzette in the musical film Absolute Beginners (1986) and as Rika van den Haas in Lethal Weapon 2 (1989) before starring in the films Blue Tornado (1991), Timebomb (1991), Twenty-One (1991), Blame It on the Bellboy (1992), Bitter Harvest (1993), Full Eclipse (1993), Angels & Insects (1995), Love and Betrayal (1995) and Grace of My Heart (1996).

Following a return to television, between 2004 and 2006, Kensit played the role of Sadie King in the ITV soap opera Emmerdale and following that, she played Faye Morton in the BBC One medical drama Holby City from 2007 until 2010, and for an episode in 2019. Since 2023, she has played Emma Harding in EastEnders. Kensit has been married to musicians Dan Donovan, Jim Kerr, Liam Gallagher and Jeremy Healy.

Kensit was nominated for the Young Artist Award for Best Juvenile Actress in a Motion Picture for her role in Hanover Street (1979). In 1991, she was nominated for the Independent Spirit Award for Best Female Lead in Twenty-One (1991), and later had several nominations for her role in Emmerdale.

Early life and education
Kensit was born on 4 March 1968, at the General Lying-In Hospital, Lambeth, to James and Margaret Rose Kensit (née Doohan). Kensit's maternal grandparents hailed from County Leitrim, Ireland. She has an older brother, Jamie, born in 1963. Her mother was a secretary at Dior and former model, who had previously dated Aga Khan IV, while Kensit's father was a close associate of both the Kray Twins and the Richardson Gang, earning himself the nickname "Jimmy the Dip", and was involved in the Great Train Robbery. He served time in prison before Kensit was born and used a cover as an antiques dealer. Kensit's godfather was Reggie Kray. Her paternal grandfather was a robber and counterfeiter. Kensit spent her childhood living on a council estate in Hounslow and had to sleep on mattresses on the floor. Kensit attended Newland House School, St Catherine's School, Twickenham, and Corona Theatre School.

Career

Early work
In 1972, at the age of four, Kensit appeared in a television advert for Birds Eye frozen peas. She had her first big-screen role in the film For the Love of Ada. Her next film role was two years later in The Great Gatsby, with Robert Redford and Mia Farrow, the latter of whom she portrayed in the 1995 biopic, Love and Betrayal: The Mia Farrow Story. Later in 1974, she had a small role in the thriller film Gold alongside Roger Moore and Susannah York. She then starred in Alfie Darling (1975) with Joan Collins. Following that, Kensit had a leading role in the 1976 Soviet-American co-production, The Blue Bird, and she struck up a friendship with actress and co-star Elizabeth Taylor. In 1979, Kensit starred in the war-romance film Hanover Street, opposite Harrison Ford and Christopher Plummer. She was nominated for Young Artist Award for Best Juvenile Actress in a Motion Picture at the Young Artist Awards for her role in the film.

In the early 1980s, Kensit began to appear regularly in films. In 1981, she starred as Estella in the BBC adaptation of Great Expectations. An important role was Lady Margaret Plantagenet in the 1982 BBC Television Shakespeare production of Richard III. In the same year, she starred as the title character in the Walt Disney episode The Adventures of Pollyanna.

Rise to fame
In 1983, she starred as the leading character in the TV series Luna. The following year she starred in the children's play The Prattling Princess. In 1985, she starred in the films Silas Marner and The Corsican Brothers.

In 1983, with her brother Jamie Kensit, she helped set up the band Eighth Wonder, which included Steve Grantley and Geoff Beauchamp.

In 1985, Kensit pursued a dual career as a singer and an actress. She starred as Eppie in an adaptation of Silas Marner, with Ben Kingsley. At the time, Kensit stated: "All I want is to be more famous than anything or anyone".

In 1986, she won the lead female role in the film version of Absolute Beginners, based on the book by Colin MacInnes. In November 1987, she sang a duet with the Italian singer and songwriter Eros Ramazzotti, entitled  ("The Good Light of the Stars").

In 1988, Kensit's band Eighth Wonder had two Top 40 singles: "I'm Not Scared", written by Neil Tennant and Chris Lowe and produced by the Pet Shop Boys and Phil Harding (for PWL), which reached Number 7 in the British charts. "Cross My Heart" reached Number 13. Although the band's success quickly waned, Kensit focused solely on her acting career, appearing in the 1989 film Lethal Weapon 2 as Rika van den Haas, a South African consulate secretary with whom detective Martin Riggs, played by Mel Gibson, falls in love.

In 1991, she had a leading role in the romantic comedy, Does This Mean We're Married? during which she sings the song "Rambo Doll".

Kensit appeared in the 1991 film Twenty-One, for which she received a nomination for Independent Spirit Award for Best Female Lead. Of her role, Variety magazine wrote, "Fans of Kensit get plenty of her; her lovely face and form are always the center of attention. The cool control with which she executes the role is admirable". In 1992, she had a leading role in the British film Blame it on the Bellboy as Miss Carolyn Wright, a desperate estate agent in Venice who would stop at nothing to clinch a deal.

In 1995, Kensit starred with Kristin Scott Thomas and Mark Rylance in Angels & Insects, which was directed by Philip Haas, and was nominated for an Academy Award for Costume Design. Kensit's last major lead film role was in the Newcastle-based The One and Only.

2004–2010
In 2004, Kensit joined the cast of soap opera Emmerdale as Sadie King, and also regularly featured in the third series of Channel 4's Bo' Selecta!, along with its 2005 spin-off series A Bear's Tail. Kensit's success as the soap super-bitch in a popular comedy brought her back to the public's attention. In September 2006, Kensit left Emmerdale, stating that commuting to Yorkshire and the time away from her sons was too stressful.

In September and October 2005, Kensit appeared as a celebrity contestant in Ant & Dec's Gameshow Marathon, progressing through to Play Your Cards Right, before being eliminated by Carol Vorderman. On 23 June 2006, Kensit guest hosted  The Friday Night Project with band Placebo. She appeared as the Grand High Witch of all the World at the Children's Party at the Palace in celebration of the Queen's 80th birthday in 2006. She also became the voice of online gambling website 32red.com.

In January 2007, Kensit joined the BBC One medical drama Holby City as ward sister Faye Morton. On 14 March 2010, it was revealed that she had decided to leave the show. In May 2019, it was announced that Kensit would reprise her role as Faye Morton for an episode, later in the year.

In August 2008, Kensit appeared as a subject in the sixth series of Who Do You Think You Are?. Until Bruce Forsyth's episode broadcast in July 2010, it became the highest-rated episode for the programme, being seen by 7.10 million viewers. As of 2023, it is still the second-highest rating episode of the programme.

In September 2010, Kensit participated as a contestant on the eighth series of Strictly Come Dancing. She was partnered with professional dancer Robin Windsor. They were the eighth couple to be eliminated from the competition, finishing in seventh place.

2011–present
On 15 May 2012, she narrated the Channel 4 documentary Sex, Lies and Rinsing Guys. On 7 April 2014, Kensit was a guest panellist on  ITV chat show Loose Women. On 7 January 2015, Kensit took part as a housemate in the fifteenth series of Celebrity Big Brother. She was the third celebrity to be evicted from the House, after spending 21 days.

In 2018, Kensit started her Conscious Puberty campaign, which came about after she experienced significant challenges during the menopause. She now uses the campaign across social media channels to converse with other women of every age.

In March 2021, Kensit appeared on BBC Two's Richard Osman's House of Games. Later that year she has a guest appearance in an episode of McDonald & Dodds and starred in the film The Pebble and the Boy.

In January 2023, Kensit joined EastEnders as Emma Harding, Lola Pearce's estranged biological mother.

Personal life
Kensit has been married and divorced four times. In 1988, she married Dan Donovan of the band Big Audio Dynamite but they divorced in 1991. In 1992, she married Jim Kerr, lead singer of Simple Minds. During her second marriage, she gave birth to her first child, a son named James, in 1993. In April 1997, she married Liam Gallagher from the band Oasis at Marylebone Town Hall. Kensit and Gallagher had a son, Lennon, born 13 September 1999, who was named after John Lennon. Lennon's godmother is actress Elizabeth Hurley, Kensit's co-star in the film Kill Cruise. Kensit and Gallagher divorced in 2000. She later became involved with the DJ Jeremy Healy and announced that she was marrying for a fourth time on 29 November 2007. On 31 March 2008, it was reported that the pair had split by mutual consent and had called off their wedding. They reconciled, and married on 18 April 2009, in an event covered by a magazine, but it was reported in February 2010 that the couple had separated. Healy was not mentioned in her 2013 autobiography.

After a relationship with footballer Ally McCoist in 2001, Kensit later became involved with rap artist and beatboxer Killa Kela. They split up after a year, with Kensit stating that she did not see a future with Kela. She has also been romantically linked with footballer Ryan Giggs, comedian and actor David Walliams and footballer Michael Gray.

Kensit is a Roman Catholic, although she identifies as an à la carte member of the faith. Kensit had her children baptised and confirmed in the Catholic tradition. She began attending church after her mother's death.

Filmography

Film

Television

Guest appearances
Strictly Come Dancing (2010) – Contestant
Celebrity Juice (17 March 2011) – Panelist
8 Out of 10 Cats Uncut (8 July 2011) – Panelist
Would I Lie to You? (18 May 2012) – Guest
The Million Pound Drop Live (2012) – Contestant with Keith Lemon
The Chase: Celebrity Special (27 September 2014) – Contestant with Natalie Anderson, Esther Rantzen, and Brian McFadden; won
Loose Women (2014) – Guest presenter 
Celebrity Big Brother (2015) – Housemate
Pointless: Celebrity Special (19 September 2020) – Contestant with Jake Canuso; won
Richard Osman's House of Games (1–5 March 2021) – Contestant

See also
 List of Celebrity Big Brother (British TV series) housemates
 List of Strictly Come Dancing contestants

References

External links

 

1968 births
Living people
20th-century English actresses
21st-century English actresses
Actresses from London
Alumni of the Italia Conti Academy of Theatre Arts
English child actresses
English film actresses
English people of Irish descent
English pop singers
English Roman Catholics
English soap opera actresses
English stage actresses
English television actresses
People educated at Newland House School
People educated at St Catherine's School, Twickenham
People from Lambeth
People from Hounslow
Singers from London